Sagina Muratkyzy (born 11 November 2003)  is a Kazakh rhythmic gymnast, member of the national group.

Personal life 
Muratkyzy began the sport at age four. She has received the title of Master of Sport of International Class in Kazakhstan. She's studying physical education at LN Gumilyov Eurasian National University in Nur-Sultan.

Career 
Sagina entered the national senior group in 2019, competing at the World Championships in Baku where the Kazakh team was 24th in the All-Around and both routines. In 2021 she competed in Kitakyushu for the World Championships where Kazakhstan was 16th in the group All-Around and with 5 balls, 15th with 3 hoops and 4 clubs.

In 2022 she debuted at the World Cup in Athens where she was 4th in the All-Around and with 3 ribbons and 2 balls, winning bronze with 5 hoops. A month later in Tashkent the group won silver in the All-Around and with 3 ribbons and 2 balls as well as bronze with 5 hoops. A week later she competed in Baku with the group, taking 7th place in the All-Around and won bronze with 3 ribbons and 2 balls. In June she took part in the World Cup in Pesaro, ending 8th in the All-Around and with 3 balls and 2 balls, 6th with 5 hoops. From June 23 to 26 the group participated at the 2022 Asian Rhythmic Gymnastics Championships in Pattaya, winning gold with 5 hoops, silver in teams and bronze in the group All-Around. In September Muratkyzy took part in the World Championships in Sofia along Aruzhan Kassenova, Aidana Shakenova, Assel Shukirbay, Renata Zholdinova, and the two individuals Elzhana Taniyeva and Aibota Yertaikyzy, taking 24th place in the All-Around, 26th with 5 hoops and 21st with 3 ribbons + 2 balls.

References 

Living people
2003 births
Kazakhstani rhythmic gymnasts